National Highway 347BG, commonly referred to as NH 347BG is a national highway in India. It is a secondary route of National Highway 47.  NH-347BG runs in the state of Madhya Pradesh in India.

Route 
NH347BG connects Deshgaon, Sanawad, Barwaha and (Bhawarkua Chowk) at Indore in the state of Madhya Pradesh.

Junctions  
 
  Terminal near Deshgaon.
  Bhawarkuwa Terminal near Indore.

See also 
 List of National Highways in India
 List of National Highways in India by state

References

External links 

 NH 347BG on OpenStreetMap

National highways in India
National Highways in Madhya Pradesh